SABC 3 (stylised as S3) is a South African free-to-air public television network owned by the South African Broadcasting Corporation (SABC). It carries programming in English and, few in other South African languages. It has a number of its own reality and talk shows and had lately introduced a new series called “The Estate”.

As of June 2018, it has been broadcasting in high definition.

In April 2021, the channel rebranded and is stylised as S3.

History
On 1 January 1981, two services were introduced, TV2 broadcasting in Zulu and Xhosa and TV3 broadcasting in Sotho and Tswana, both targeted at a Black urban audience. The main channel, now called TV1, was divided evenly between English and Afrikaans, as before. In 1986, a new service called TV4 was introduced, carrying sports and entertainment programming, using the channel shared by TV2 and TV3, which stopped broadcasting at 9:30pm.

In 1991, TV2, TV3 and TV4 were combined into a new service called CCV (Contemporary Community Values). A third channel was introduced known as TSS, or TopSport Surplus, TopSport being the brand name for the SABC's sport coverage, but this was replaced by NNTV (National Network TV), an educational, non-commercial channel, in 1994.
In 1996, the SABC reorganised its three TV channels with the aim of making them more representative of the various language groups. These new channels were called SABC 1, SABC 2 and SABC 3.

SABC3 inherited many of its programs from TV1, South Africa's apartheid-era "white" channel. SABC 3 is targeted at South Africa's affluent English-speaking community; the channel's primary target market is viewers aged 18 to 49. It screens a combination of international programming from the United States and United Kingdom, as well as locally produced soap operas, talk shows and drama series. SABC 3 ranks fourth out of South Africa's five analogue channels in audience ratings.

Programming
SABC3 is the only SABC channel to feature a large proportion of international series. It has deals with studio companies in the US and various television networks in the UK to air some series with a few months' delay from their international airdates.

Soapies, dramas and telenovelas 
The channel is known for its longest-running soapie Isidingo, and previously aired local dramas such as High Rollers, and popular international soaps Days of Our Lives and The Bold and the Beautiful, which SABC3 stopped airing because of financial constraints. This upset viewers fond of the soapie and started a petition to keep the show running. The channel currently offers international dramas such as Knightfall, NCIS, House of Cards, MotherFatherSon, Line of Duty, El Chapo & Killing Eve. In April 2021, the channel introduced a new local drama "The Estate" as well as three new telenovelas like Orphans Of A Nation, The Bay and The Red Room.

Children and education 

The channel has local children's content such as Challenge SOS, Talent on Track, Yum.Me and Hectic on 3, along with and international catalogue of kids and teens entertainment from Disney and Nickelodeon. This includes kids shows such as Mickey Mouse Clubhouse, Go Jetters and My Friends Tigger & Pooh, as well as teen shows such as Victorious, iCarly, Wizards of Waverly Place, Shake It Up, Cory in the House, Girl Meets World, Sam & Cat, Winx Club, Violetta, Polly Pocket, Kuu Kuu Harajuku, Sanjay and Craig, Henry Danger, Nowhere Boys, Noah & Saskia, Spellbinder, Spellbinder: Land of the Dragon Lord, Mortified, Legacy of the Silver Shadow, Crash Zone and Hectic on 3. Unlike its sister channels, SABC 3 has less programming from the SABC Education banner.

Series 
SABC3 used to license and produce local versions of international series like NBC's The Apprentice, BBC's The Weakest Link and Bravo's Top Chef. The South African adaptions of The Apprentice and The Weakest Link have been off air and out of production for longer than 10 years.

In 2017, Hlaudi Motsoeneng who was then COO of the SABC, decreed that SABC TV stations should broadcast 90% local content. The decree turned out to be unsuccessful, as the local productions were the least watched on the channel. After some time, their flagship international series returned, such as Survivor and The Amazing Race. The channel currently has reality series such as Judge Faith, Ready for Love and Christina Milian:Turned up. The channel also offers nature documentaries from National Geographic and BBC Earth.

Music 
The channel also focuses on adult contemporary and urban music and has music specials from local and international artists. Shows like The Mic, Base 3 and Tapestry are aired on the channel. SABC 3 broadcasts Koze Kuse from SABC 1 from August 2019 to April 2021.

Talk and magazine 
SABC 3 has a heavy focus on local and international talk and magazines such as the breakfast show Expresso, Afternoon Express, The Real, The Scoop and Harry (talk show).

Sports 
SABC3  broadcasts All Cricket South Africa Inbound Tours Of The Momentum Proteas And Proteas Men's Team.It Also Broadcasts The Bundesliga On Weekends,Women's Super League The Sasol League And The Hollywoodbets Super League.It Also Broadcasts LFC TV On It's Sports Show Sports Arena Including WSB Horseracing, Formula E, FIA WRC, Extreme E And Sports Highlights. The Channel Also Provides Overflow Space For CAF Competitions And Premier Soccer League Matches.

News and current affairs 
The channel serves news for English speakers, simulcasting news broadcasts with their SABC NEWS CHANNEL. It also has local and international current affairs and documentaries. SABC 3 also broadcast Deutsche Welle & DW News all the way from Germany in English. In April 2021, SABC 3 has a new current affairs news programme called Prime NEWS On 3, now it will be broadcasting Weekdays at 8pm & Weekends at 6pm.

Movies 
The channel provides action, horror, drama, comedy, sci-fi, adventure, thriller, romance and fantasy movies during primetime. SABC 3 is well known for broadcasting popular Bollywood movies in their original Hindi & Tamil soundtrack.

See also 
 List of South African media

References

External links

Television stations in South Africa
Television channels and stations established in 1996
English-language television stations in South Africa
Afrikaans-language television